Animaux is a French television channel themed about animals.

History 
Created in April 1996, AB Animaux was a channel which showed animal documentaries. In 1999, it was renamed as Animaux.

After rumours of the sale of the channel by AB Groupe at the start of 2006, the channel eventually ended up being exclusively shown on CanalSat.

Owners 
President: Jean-Michel Fava
Programme director: Richard Maroko
Marketing & Business Development director: Gregg Bywalski

Budget 
Animaux is run by AB Sat SA with a budget of €24 million, 100% provided by AB Groupe.

Programmes 
The channel specialises in the environment, and principally shows animal documentaries. It has also introduced regular reports on the protection of flora and fauna. Allain Bougrain-Dubourg joined the channel as a director in 2005.

Programmes 
Territoires Sauvages : Discovery of inexpored territories and the animals who live there (Tuesday 17:55)
Des Animaux et des Hommes : Stories about the relationship between man and animal (Saturday 18:25) *Totalement Fauve : Big game, such as lion, puma, tiger and leopard, (Thursday 17:55).
A Vol d'Oiseau :  Programme based on ornithology (Friday 17:55).
Animaux en Danger : Programme which deals with saving the planet, (Sunday 19:00).
Histoires d'eaux : The story of animal life in fresh and salt water (Wednesday 17:55).

Broadcast 
Animaux was originally only shown via AB Sat, but is now available on a contract on French, Monacan, Belgian and Swiss cable and via the Canalsat or Bis TV packages available to customers on IPTV platforms.

See also 

 Toute l'Histoire
 Science et Vie TV
 Trek
 Chasse et Pêche

References

External links 
  Programmes on Animaux

Mediawan Thematics
Television channels and stations established in 1996
1996 establishments in France
French-language television stations
Television stations in France